Spanish Masala is a 2012 Indian romantic comedy film directed by Lal Jose. The film stars Dileep, Kunchacko Boban, Biju Menon and Daniela Zacherl.  

The film was released on 20 January 2012. The film received positive reviews, but unfortunately, the film was a box-office flop.

Plot
The story set in Spain, and revolves around Charlie, an illegal immigrant stranded in Madrid. To make things worse, he is conversant only in Malayalam. He gets a job as a cook in an Indian restaurant, as he has some experience in running a roadside eatery in his homeland, run by an expatriate, Majid. In the restaurant he is assigned with the task of serving up various types of dosa and, he comes up with a local variant named Spanish Masala. This turns out to be his passport to employment in the home of an ex-diplomat, who had earlier served in India.

There he meets the diplomat's daughter Camilla, who is visually impaired. She becomes a big time fan of Charlie's Spanish Masala. She is not on talking terms with her father, who is believed to have killed her Indian lover, Rahul, the son of her Malayali nanny, from whom she has learnt to speak Malayalam. Later Camilla starts to get closer to Charlie. Since he can imitate impersonate voices, one servant Pappan leads him to imitate Rahul's voice and keep Rahul's memory alive.

After some days, she recovers and her eyesight returns, but now her father is no more. A strange incident occurs when Rahul arrives for his funeral. One day, as per Menon's instruction, Charlie cleans Señor's (Camilla's dad) room. He finds a CD which Señor had seen before he died, and from that he finds out that Rahul was sent to Portugal to avoid the relationship between Camilla and Rahul, by paying him money by Señor. Again Rahul is spared by Charlie.

As it goes, one day Menon enters a bar where he sees Rahul and another girl dancing together. He went to interrogate about it by following him, when he saw Rahul sitting with some goons and the girl. Later he researched it, when he discovered it wasn't a good life for Rahul in Portugal. He sold the factory which Señor offered him and he had taken a loan from some goons for gambling and could not repay them. Camilla heard about it and she felt sorrow that she was keeping a crooked lover in her mind. Later Camilla and Menon return to Kerala, India to fix marriage between Charlie and Camilla.

Cast

 Dileep as Charlie: A famous mimicry artist and cook
 Kunchacko Boban as Rahul: Kamila's lover
 Biju Menon as Menon
 Daniela Zacherl as Camilla: a blind Spanish girl
 Javier Sandoval as Spanish ambassador Philp De Albey: Camilla's father
 Chrys Hobbs as Maria de Albey: sister of Philip
 Clemens Berndorff as Fernado: son of Maria De Albey
 Raquel Ameghashie as Jennifer: wife of Pappan
 Nelson Sooranad as Pappan
 Vinaya Prasad as Margaret: Rahul's mother
 Kalaranjini as Theresa: Charlie's mother
 Sivaji Guruvayoor as Cyril: Charlie's father
 Nandhu Pothuval as Troupe Manager Ravi
 Majeed as Varghese Maash
 Niyas Backer as Mimicry Artist
 Gopalan as Majeed Ikka
 Nivin Pauly as Mathews (cameo)
 Archana Kavi as Lily: Charlie's sister (cameo)
 Franco Simon as himself (cameo)

Production
The film was shot in Madrid. One song was shot in Vienna, and the remainder was shot in Cochin and Alappuzha districts of Kerala. The film portrays several Spanish arts, festivals and sports such as bullfighting, flamenco dance and La Tomatina which was the real la tomatina festival shot for the first time in Indian cinema. Daniela Zacherl, the female lead, is an Austrian model. She replaced Amy Jackson who had to drop out due to conflicts with Ekk Deewana Tha.

Music

The audio launch was done on 14 December at IMA Hall in Kochi. Song composer was Vidyasagar, the lyrics are penned by R. Venugopal. The soundtrack was rated 6/10 by Music Aloud.

References

External links
 

2012 films
2010s Malayalam-language films
2012 romantic comedy films
Films set in Spain
Films scored by Vidyasagar
Films shot in Alappuzha
Films shot in Kochi
Films directed by Lal Jose
Cooking films
Films about food and drink
Indian romantic comedy films